RNA, ribosomal 1, also known as RNR1, is a human gene.

References

Further reading

 Nucleolus organizer regions are chromosomal regions crucial for the formation of the nucleolus, located on the short arms of the acrocentric chromosomes 13, 14, 15, 21 and 22

Proteins
Non-coding RNA
RNA
Ribosomal RNA
Ribozymes